laut-Los is the first acoustic album by Christina Stürmer. Released on 4 April 2008, it includes five new songs. The song "Fieber" is the official anthem of the Austrian soccer team for the EURO 2008.

The album was certified Platinum in Austria.

Track listing 
 Augenblick am Tag (Day in the Blink of an Eye) - 3:09
 Glücklich (Lucky) - 2:55
 Träume leben ewig (Dreams Live Forever) - 3:52
 Optimist (Optimist) - 3:08
 Mitten Unterm Jahr (Under the Middle Years) - 4:19
 Nie zu spät (Never Too Late) - 4:07
 Fieber (Fever) - 3:11
 An Sommertagen (On Summerdays) - 3:25
 Geh nicht wenn du kommst (Do Not Go If You Come) - 4:02
 Orchester in mir (Orchestra in Me) - 3:40
 Ich lebe (I Live) - 3:16
 Engel fliegen einsam (Angels Fly Lonely) - 4:14
 Lebe lauter (Live Louder) - 3:52
 Ohne Dich (Without You) - 3:12 [iTunes only]

Unplugged album 

All the songs on laut-Los were rerecorded for the album in "unplugged" format except five new songs. Träume leben ewig, Optimist, Nie zu spät, Fieber, and Ochester in mir are new songs not previously recorded on any of Christina Stürmer's previous albums.

Singles 
"Träume leben ewig" was the first single of laut-Los. It reached ten in Austria, and number forty in Germany.

"Fieber" was the second single from laut-Los. The song was released on 23 May 2008. Fieber is also the official anthem of the Austrian soccer team for the EURO 2008. The music video for Fieber shows Stürmer sitting outside watching the soccer game, and throughout the video, other sports fans join her and by the end of the video she has a crowd with her watching the game.

Charts

Weekly charts

Year-end charts

Certifications

References

Christina Stürmer albums
Polydor Records albums
2008 compilation albums
German-language albums